Harold J. Lilie was an American bridge player from Las Vegas, Nevada.

Bridge accomplishments

Awards
 Mott-Smith Trophy (1) 1982

Wins
 North American Bridge Championships (5)
 Lebhar IMP Pairs (1) 1995 
 Wernher Open Pairs (1) 1982 
 Mitchell Board-a-Match Teams (1) 1982 
 Chicago Mixed Board-a-Match (2) 1986, 1995

Runners-up
 North American Bridge Championships
 Grand National Teams (1) 1995 
 Vanderbilt (1) 1984

References

American contract bridge players
People from the Las Vegas Valley
Living people
Year of birth missing (living people)
Place of birth missing (living people)